Vice Admiral Atul Kumar Jain PVSM, AVSM, VSM is a retired Indian naval officer who served as the 2nd Vice Chief of Defence Staff of India. He assumed the position on 28 February 2021. Previously, he  served as Flag Officer Commanding-in-Chief Eastern Naval Command of the Indian Navy.

Career
He was commissioned in the Indian Navy in July 1982. He is an alumnus of Sainik School Rewa; National Defence Academy (Pune); the Defence Services Staff College; the College of Naval Warfare (Mumbai) and the National Defence College (Pretoria, South Africa). He is a graduate from Jawaharlal Nehru University and has received his Masters in Defence and Strategic Studies from Madras University.

Awards and decorations

References

Sainik School alumni
Living people
Year of birth missing (living people)
Indian Navy admirals
Flag Officers Commanding Eastern Fleet
National Defence Academy (India) alumni
Recipients of the Param Vishisht Seva Medal
Recipients of the Ati Vishisht Seva Medal
Recipients of the Vishisht Seva Medal
Defence Services Staff College alumni